Coutts/Ross International Airport  is located  west of Coutts, Alberta, Canada and  west of Sweet Grass, Montana, United States.

Ross International Airport is owned by the U.S. state of Montana and is operated by the Montana Aeronautics Division. Its runway is located on the Canada–US border.

The airport is one of six airports that straddle the Canada–US border. The others are Avey Field State Airport, Whetstone International Airport, International Peace Garden Airport, Piney Pinecreek Border Airport, and Coronach/Scobey Border Station Airport.

The airport is classified as an airport of entry by Nav Canada and is staffed by the Canada Border Services Agency (CBSA). CBSA officers at this airport can handle general aviation aircraft only, with no more than 15 passengers.

Facilities and aircraft 
For the 12-month period ending August 23, 2008, the airport had 25 general aviation aircraft operations, an average of 2 per month.

References

External links
 Page about this airport on COPA's Places to Fly airport directory
 

Registered aerodromes in Alberta
County of Warner No. 5
Airports in Montana
Buildings and structures in Toole County, Montana
Transportation in Toole County, Montana
Binational airports